The theme for Jazz Baltica 2009 was "Big Band Battle".

Bands and events

References

External links
 Jazz Baltica

2009 in music
Jazz Baltica
2009 music festivals
2009 in German music